Hubert Thomas may refer to:
Hubert George Octavius Thomas, architect in Brisbane, Queensland, Australia
Hubert Thomas, musician on The Voice of the Turtle (album)
Hubert Thomas (rugby), in 2013 NACRA Rugby Championship

See also

Bert Thomas (disambiguation)